Training Group (TG) of the Royal Air Force was the group that controlled the stations of Personnel and Training Command.

History 

It was formed on 1 April 1994 from the AOC Training Units with Personnel and Training Command its controlling formation.  On 30 October 2006, Training Group was renamed as Number 22 (Training) Group.  Formally, Training Group ceased to exist and No. 22 Group was established.

Prior to 1 April 2006 Training Group held British Government agency status, operating as the Training Group Defence Agency (TGDA).  Upon the loss of its agency status, the formation became known simply as Training Group.

Responsibility 

The Group had seven areas of responsibility:
RAF College Cranwell and Directorate of Recruiting
Directorate of Flying Training (DFT)
Directorate of Joint Technical Training (DJTT)
Air Cadets (ACO)
Core HQ
Defence College of Aeronautical Engineering (DCAE)
Defence College of Communications and Information Systems (DCCIS)

Air Officer Commanding 

Training Group's last Air Officer Commanding was Air Vice-Marshal John Ponsonby who was both Chief of Staff Training and Air Officer Commanding Training Group.  The Air Officer Commanding was responsible to his superior commander, the Air Member for Personnel, who was also Air Officer Commanding-in-Chief Personnel & Training Command.

Commanders
1992 Air Vice-Marshal Christopher C. C. Coville
1994 Air Vice Marshal John A G May 
8 January 1997 Air Vice-Marshal A. J. Stables 
17 November 1999 Air Vice-Marshal I. S. Corbitt
4 April 2002 Air Vice-Marshal Graham A. Miller
2003 Air Vice-Marshal David A. Walker
4 January 2005 Air Vice-Marshal John M. M. Ponsonby

For more information
Royal Air Force No 22 (Training) Group

|-
 
 

Training units and formations of the Royal Air Force
Royal Air Force groups
Military units and formations established in 1994
Military units and formations disestablished in 2006